Bhimnagar may refer to 

Bhimnagar, Supaul, near India-Nepal border in Bihar
Bhimnagar district, Uttar Pradesh

See also
Bhimgarh, West Bengal
Bhimgarh Fort, near Reasi in Jammu and Kashmir